Rooms is the only album released by Goya Dress, the Scottish band fronted by Astrid Williamson released on Nude Records in 1996. The album was produced by John Cale, musician and former member of The Velvet Underground.

Critical reception
This release on Suede's Nude Records drew favourable comparisons to the band: AllMusic called Rooms "every bit as elegant, grand and enchanting as the glam revivalists Dog Man Star." while the NME recalled their "idiosyncratic, atmospheric sound straddled a rich range of styles."

Track listing
 "Sweet Dreams For You"
 "Crush"
 "Scorch"
 "Rooms"
 "Greatest Secret"
 "Glorious"
 "Any John"
 "Katie Stood On the Benches"
 "Picture This"
 "The Maritime Waltz"

Personnel and recording details
 Astrid Williamson - vocals, guitar, piano, string arrangements
 Terry de Castro - bass, backing vocals
 Simon Pearson - drums
 James Banbury - cello 
 Abigail Trundle - cello 
 Alex Poots - trumpet
 Dick Morgan - oboe
 Teresa Whipple - viola
 Geoff Leach - Hammond organ
 Anton Kirkpatrick - guitar
 Mark Crooks - clarinet
 Marcus Broome - violin
 Produced and mixed by John Cale
 Additional mixing by Dave Bascombe
 All songs written by Astrid Williamson and Goya Dress
 Photography by Vincent MacDonald

References

1996 albums
Goya Dress albums
Albums produced by John Cale